Melaleuca xerophila is a shrub or small tree in the myrtle family Myrtaceae and is native to arid parts of South Australia and Western Australia. It is a large shrub with narrow leaves and heads of white or cream-coloured flowers in spring.

Description

The flowers are white or cream-coloured and are arranged in heads near the ends of the branches, each head usually consisting of one to nine individual flowers. The stamens are arranged in bundles of five around the flower, with 15 to 22 stamens in each bundle.

Taxonomy and naming
Melaleuca xerophila was first formally described in 1988 by Bryan Barlow in Australian Systematic Botany. The specific epithet (xerophila) is derived from the Ancient Greek words ξερός (xeros), meaning “dry” and φίλος (phílos), meaning “dear one" or "friend”, referring to the arid habitat of this species.

Distribution and habitat
This melaleuca occurs in arid locations in central South Australia and from the Roy Hill district south to the Leonora - Laverton district in Western Australia. It usually grows in depressions near salt lakes in calcareous soils.

Conservation
Melaleuca xerophila is classified as "not threatened" by the Government of Western Australia Department of Parks and Wildlife.

Uses

Essential oils
This leaf oil of this species is mostly monoterpenes but the yield is low.

Horticulture
This species may have use in land rehabilitation in very dry climates.

References

xerophila
Myrtales of Australia
Flora of Western Australia
Plants described in 1988